Daniele Marchitelli (born 12 January 1955), best known as Lele Marchitelli, is an Italian musician and composer.

Life and career 
Born in Rome, Marchitelli studied guitar and bass as an autodidact. Between 1976 and 1977 he was a member of the group Americanta. Between late 1970s and early 1980s he collaborated as a bassist to some albums by Maria Carta and Carlo Siliotto and was a member of the group Gramigna.

Starting from 1984, Marchitelli focused on composing, first music for commercials, and later scores for films and television series. He was nominated two times for David di Donatello for best score  and five times for Silver Ribbon for best score.

Selected filmography

     1987 - Specters
     1987 - Il grande Blek
     1992 - Volevamo essere gli U2 
     1996 - I'm Crazy About Iris Blond
     2000 - Il segreto del giaguaro
     2001 - Off to the Revolution by a 2CV
     2003 - It Can’t Be All Our Fault
     2006 - Quale amore
     2007 - Piano, solo  
     2013 - The Great Beauty
     2014 - Noi 4
     2016 - The Young Pope
     2017 - Spettacolo
     2018 – Loro
     2020 - The New Pope
     2021 - Mare of Easttown
     2021 - The Hand of God

References

External links

 

1955 births
Living people
Musicians from Rome
Italian male composers
Italian film score composers
Italian male film score composers